The Roman Catholic Diocese of Kagoshima is a suffragan Latin diocese in the Ecclesiastical province of the Metropolitan Archbishop of Nagasaki 長崎, in southern Japan.

Its episcopal see is the Cathedral of St. Francis Xavier (Xavier Church), in the city of Kagoshima.

History 
 Established on March 18, 1927 as Apostolic Prefecture of Kagoshima, an exempt missionary pre-diocesan jurisdiction, on territory split off from the then Diocese of Nagasaki (now its Metropolitan)
 On 27 March 1927 it lost territory to establish the Mission sui juris of Miyazaki 宮崎
 In 1947 it lost territory (the Ryukyu Islands) to establish the Apostolic Administration of Okinawa and the Southern Islands 琉球列島
 Promoted on February 25, 1955 as Diocese of Kagoshima, hence no longer directly subject to the Holy See

Ordinaries 
(all Roman Rite)

Apostolic Prefects of Kagoshima
 Egide Marie Roy (エジド・ロア), Friars Minor (O.F.M.) (1929.05.11 – death 1936)
 Francis Xavier Ichitaro Ideguchi (フランシスコ出口一太郎) (1940.06.10 – death 1955), previously Apostolic Administrator of Apostolic Prefecture of Miyazaki 宮崎 (Japan) (1940 – 1945.11.18)

Suffragan Bishops of Kagoshima 
 ? Paul Aijirô Yamaguchi † (9 November 1936 - 15 September 1937) 
Joseph Asjiro Satowaki † (25 February 1955 - 19 December 1968), later Metropolitan Archbishop of Nagasaki 長崎 (Japan) (1968.12.19 – 1990.02.08), President of Catholic Bishops’ Conference of Japan (1978 – 1983), created Cardinal-Priest of S. Maria della Pace (1979.06.30 – death 1996.08.08) 
Paul Shinichi Itonaga (15 November 1969 - 3 December 2005) 
Paul Kenjiro Koriyama (3 December 2005 - 7 July 2018)
Francis Xavier Hiroaki Nakano (7-July 2018- Present)

See also 
 Roman Catholicism in Japan

Sources and external links
 GCatholic.org with incumbent biography links
 Catholic Hierarchy

Other External links 
 Diocese website (Japanese)
 Diocese at the website of the Catholic Bishops' Conference of Japan (Japanese)

Roman Catholic dioceses in Japan
Christian organizations established in 1927
Roman Catholic dioceses and prelatures established in the 20th century